Inès Jaurena (born 14 May 1991) is a French professional footballer who plays as a midfielder, who most recently played for Division 1 Féminine club Lyon, and the France national team.

Club career
On 18 July 2022, Lyon announced the signing of Jaurena on a one-year deal until June 2023. The Washington Spirit has signed midfielder Inès Jaurena to a one-year contract, the club announced today, February 7, 2023. Jaurena, 31, will join the NWSL after playing professionally in France for the past ten years. Jaurena left Lyon on 29 January 2023 after her contract was ended by mutual agreement.

International career
Jaurena made her senior team debut on 20 October 2017 in a 1–0 friendly win against England.

Career statistics

International

Notes

References

External links
 
 
 
 Profile at Florida State Seminoles

1991 births
Living people
Footballers from Paris
Black French sportspeople
French people of Martiniquais descent
French people of Basque descent
French women's footballers
France women's youth international footballers
France women's international footballers
Women's association football midfielders
Florida State Seminoles women's soccer players
Division 1 Féminine players
Paris FC (women) players
GPSO 92 Issy players
FC Girondins de Bordeaux (women) players
Olympique Lyonnais Féminin players
French expatriate footballers
French expatriate sportspeople in the United States
Expatriate women's soccer players in the United States